Penny Irving is a former actress and a page 3 model in The Sun “newspaper”.

Career

Irving is best remembered for her roles in the 1970s sitcom Are You Being Served? (as Miss Bakewell, Young Mr Grace's secretary), appearing between 1976 and 1979 in the long-running programme; and in the movie adaptation of The Likely Lads (playing the role of Sandy).

Irving also starred in Pete Walker's 1974 film House of Whipcord, and would later appear in his 1978 film The Comeback.

Her other TV credits include The Benny Hill Show, The Two Ronnies and Hi-de-Hi!, among many others. She was a hostess on the game show Mr & Mrs in the 1970s. She also played a role in Carry On Dick.

TV roles

Filmography
 Tiffany Jones (1973) – Girl at pool party (uncredited)
 Big Zapper (1973) – Maggie
 House of Whipcord (1974) – Ann-Marie Di Verney
 Carry On Dick (1974) – Lizzy – Birds of Paradise Entertainer
 Percy's Progress (1974) – Chiquita
 Vampira (also known as Old Dracula - 1974) – Playboy Bunny
 The Likely Lads (1976) – Sandy
 The Bawdy Adventures of Tom Jones (1976) – Serving Wench (uncredited)
 Aces High (1976) – French Girl
 Are You Being Served? (1977) – Miss Nicholson
 The Comeback (1978) – Girl Singer

References

External links

Living people
English television actresses
English female models
Page 3 girls
20th-century English actresses
Year of birth missing (living people)